This list contains an overview of the government recognized Cultural Properties of the Philippines in Calabarzon. The list is based on the official lists provided by the National Commission on Culture and the Arts, National Historical Commission of the Philippines and the National Museum of the Philippines.

|}

See also 
 List of historical markers of the Philippines in Calabarzon
 List of Cultural Properties of the Philippines in Angono, Rizal

References 

Cultural Properties
Calabarzon
Cultural Properties